The Competition and Markets Authority (CMA) is the competition regulator in United Kingdom. It is a non-ministerial government department in the United Kingdom, responsible for strengthening business competition and preventing and reducing anti-competitive activities. The CMA launched in shadow form on 1 October 2013 and began operating fully on 1 April 2014, when it assumed many of the functions of the previously existing Competition Commission and Office of Fair Trading, which were abolished.

Formation
On 15 March 2012 the UK Government's Department for Business, Innovation and Skills (BIS) announced proposals for strengthening competition in the UK by merging the Office of Fair Trading and the Competition Commission to create a new single Competition and Markets Authority (CMA). The formation of the CMA was enacted in Part 3 of the Enterprise and Regulatory Reform Act 2013, which received royal assent on 25 April 2013.

In July 2012, Lord Currie was appointed chairman designate of the CMA and in January 2013 Alex Chisholm was appointed Chief Executive designate. The term 'designate' was dropped when the CMA was launched on 1 October 2013.

On 15 July 2013 BIS announced the first stage of an open public consultation period and published a summary, setting out the background to the consultation and inviting views on the draft guidance for the CMA. The first stage of the consultation ended on 6 September 2013. On 17 September, BIS announced the second stage of the consultation, which closed on 7 November 2013.

During 2013 and 2014, the CMA announced several waves of appointments at director level, reporting to members of the senior executive team.

On 28 March 2014 the CMA published the Rules of Procedure for CMA merger, market and special reference groups following a consultation which ran from 21 February to 18 March.

On 12 August 2019, the CMA's London office moved to The Cabot, 25 Cabot Square, in London's Canary Wharf area.

Responsibilities

In situations where competition could be unfair or consumer choice may be affected, the CMA is responsible for:
 investigating phase 1 and phase 2 mergers
 conducting market studies and market investigations
 investigating possible breaches of prohibitions against anti-competitive agreements under the Competition Act 1998
 bringing criminal proceedings against individuals who commit cartels offences
 enforcing consumer protection legislation, particularly the Unfair Terms in Consumer Contract Directive and Regulations
 encouraging regulators to use their competition powers
 considering regulatory references and appeals
 Regulation of public sector subsidies to business
 Oversight of the UK Internal Market

MyFerryLink ruling 
The UK Competition Commission ruled several times against MyFerryLink, an English passenger and ferry freight company, preventing its operations from Dover despite the French competition authority authorising cross-channel activity. The French government justified the decision to ban one out of three ferry operators with fair-trade concerns. The appeals court overturned these rulings, as MyFerryLink was not a merger of the bankrupt SeaFrance and Eurotunnel, the latter of which remains responsible for the management of the Channel Tunnel. MyFerryLink called attention to a potential conflict of interest, pointing out that the former accountant of DFDS, the competitor and plaintiff of the case, was now a member of the UK Competition Commission. Following these delays, Eurotunnel, owner of the boats rented to MyFerryLink, sold two new boats to the aforementioned competitor. Due to this, the port of Calais was blocked by workers, boats were occupied and the Channel Tunnel attacked, resulting in cross-channel disruption and traffic jams in the UK and France.

See also
English contract law
EU competition law

Notes

External links 
 
 
 
 

Government agencies established in 2013
2013 establishments in the United Kingdom
Competition regulators
Department for Business, Innovation and Skills
Organisations based in the London Borough of Camden
Non-ministerial departments of the Government of the United Kingdom
Financial regulatory authorities of the United Kingdom
Consumer organisations in the United Kingdom